Merutuṅga was a medieval scholar from present-day Gujarat in India and was a Śvētāmbara Jain monk of the Añcala Gaccha. He is presently most well-known for his Sanskrit text, the Prabandhacintāmaṇi, composed in 1306 CE. He also wrote Vicāraśreṇī in 1350 CE which describes the chronology of Chāvḍā, Chaulukya and Vāghelā dynasties.

Works

Prabandhacintāmaṇi 

The Prabandhacintāmaṇi was composed in Vardhamāna (modern-day Wadhwan) in VS 1361 Phālguna Śukla 15, a Sunday. In the text itself, Merutuṅga states that Gaṇī Guṇacandra compiled the first version of the text and that Dharmadeva assisted Merutuṅga in the compilation of the final version.

Therāvalī 
The Therāvalī of Merutuṅga is a Paṭṭāvalī that presents a chronology from Mahavira to the arrival of and invasion by the Sakas in India.

Vicāraśreṇī 
The Vicāraśreṇī is a bhāṣya on his earlier Therāvalī and was likely composed in VS 1363 (1306 CE).

Ṣaḍdarśananirṇaya 
The Ṣaḍdarśananirṇaya is a general exposition, a doxography of 6 contemporary religious philosophies (darśanas) during Merutuṅga's time: Buddhism, Nyāya, Sāṃkhya, Vaiśeṣika, Mīmāṃsā, and Jainism. It is unique among medieval Jain doxographies in that it presents refutations on non-Jain positions found in the other philosophies.

Mahāpuruṣacarita 
The work has survived with a bhāṣya, likely written by Merutuṅga himself, and is a charita, a biography, of five great figures in Jainism: Ṛṣabhadeva, Neminātha, Śāntinātha, Pārśvanātha, and Mahāvīra. Additionally, in the bhāṣya, the original work is named the Upadeśaśataka and the Dharmopadeśaśataka. It is also referred to as the Vivaraṇa.

Criticism 
As a historian, Merutuṅga's works are generally regarded to be of poor quality, as compared with his contemporaries and with modern historians. Gujarati historian K. M. Munshi states that dates are "the weakest point in Merutuṅga's narratives" and British Indologist A. K. Warder dismisses Merutuṅga's histories as "completely unreliable" and his narratives as "essentially fiction".

References

Citations

Sources
 
 
 
 
 
 
 
 
 
 

Ancient Indian poets
Ancient Indian writers
Indian Jain monks
Indian Jain writers
Indian Jain poets